Philosophy Hall is a building on the campus of Columbia University in New York City. It houses the English, Philosophy, and French departments, along with the university's writing center, part of its registrar's office, and the student lounge of its Graduate School of Arts and Sciences.  It is one of the original buildings designed for the university's Morningside Heights campus by McKim, Mead, and White, built in the Italian Renaissance Revival style and completed in 1910. Philosophy Hall is listed on the National Register of Historic Places and has been designated a National Historic Landmark as the site of the invention of FM radio by Edwin Armstrong in the early 1930s.

The space now occupied by the registrar formerly housed electrical engineering laboratories in which Michael I. Pupin and Edwin Howard Armstrong made several major technological breakthroughs. The building has been home to such notable faculty members as philosophers John Dewey, Frederick J. E. Woodbridge and Ernest Nagel, Guadeloupean novelist Maryse Condé, French literary scholar Michael Riffaterre, poet Kenneth Koch and English literary scholars Lionel Trilling, Edward Said, Carolyn Heilbrun, Quentin Anderson, Gayatri Chakravorty Spivak and Mark Van Doren.

Philosophy Hall was not occupied by protesters during the 1968 protests. It served instead as a refuge for faculty and a site of contentious debates among them concerning student conduct.

The lawn in front of Philosophy Hall is the site of an original cast of The Thinker (Le Penseur), one of the most famous pieces by French sculptor Auguste Rodin.

The hall was designated a National Historic Landmark in 2003.

It is one of only a handful of buildings on the Columbia campus named for an academic discipline, and not an individual. The others include Mathematics and International Affairs.

References

External links 
 

Columbia University campus
Italian Renaissance Revival architecture in the United States
McKim, Mead & White buildings
National Historic Landmarks in Manhattan
School buildings completed in 1910
School buildings on the National Register of Historic Places in Manhattan